Actinopora is a genus of bryozoans belonging to the family Plumatellidae.

The species of this genus are found in Europe.

Species

Species:

Actinopora armorica 
Actinopora auei 
Actinopora bowerbanki 
Actinopora brevis 
Actinopora brongniarti 
Actinopora campicheana 
Actinopora complicata 
Actinopora conjuncta 
Actinopora convexa 
Actinopora erecta 
Actinopora excavata 
Actinopora gregaria 
Actinopora incrassata 
Actinopora japonica 
Actinopora moneta 
Actinopora multipora 
Actinopora philippinensis 
Actinopora plana 
Actinopora plicata 
Actinopora radiata 
Actinopora regularis 
Actinopora robertsoniana 
Actinopora rugosa 
Actinopora stellata 
Actinopora striata 
Actinopora sulcata 
Actinopora tenuissima

References

Bryozoan genera